Karl Altmann (13 January 1802 in Feuchtwangen – 11 January 1861 in Munich) was a German painter.

The son of Joseph Altmann, he was born in Feuchtwangen and grew up in Ansbach. He studied painting in Munich and then at the Arts Academy Dresden, visited Italy, and settled down in Munich. 
It is traced, that he lived at Lerchen Straße 43 in Munich around 1850.

Altmann's oil paintings show scenes of alpine life, robbers, poachers, smugglers, folk festivals and other topics. He also painted still lifes. His works belong to national and international collections of established galleries.

See also
 List of German painters

References 

1802 births
1861 deaths
19th-century German painters
19th-century German male artists
German male painters
People from Ansbach (district)